The term cutting room floor is used in the film industry as a figure of speech referring to unused or scrapped footage not included in the finished film. Outside of the film industry, it may refer to any creative work unused in the final product.

The term is a reference to the pre-digital days of film editing, when films were usually edited by physically cutting the actual reels of film that had been shot. Popular conception is that unused footage would literally be left on the editing, or "cutting room" floor. In fact, offcuts of film are retained in a special cutting room bin and numbered during the editing process in case they are required later. The phrase 'bin ends' is an alternative term.

Although the omission of filmed material happens to some extent for every actor ever filmed, many famous actors' entire appearance in a particular project have ended up on the 'cutting room floor' at one stage or another throughout their careers, including Charlie Chaplin (when he accidentally walked onto the set of a "Keystone Cops" upon first arriving to Hollywood), and most of Johnny Depp's performance in Platoon (Oliver Stone felt Depp's storyline distracted from the core of the story). Other examples are Kevin Costner (as the friend whose funeral is attended in The Big Chill), John Lithgow (as super-agent Harry Zell in L.A. Story), and Phyllis Diller (as a cranky neighbor in Juno).

The actors still get paid for the performance (since they did film the 'cut' scenes, even though they were removed) and since the advent of the DVD, their performances may often be resurrected via extended director's cuts, or as extras on the deleted scenes portions included on many DVD releases.

References

Film editing